The Likhu Khola  is a left tributary of the Sun Koshi in the Himalayas in eastern Nepal. Given named by Kirat kingdom  Likhu or Liku in the Sunuwar language (Li- top, Hill, Ku-water) means Top (Hill) Water.

The river is the glacier Zurmoche on the southern slope of Likhu Chuli. It flows in direction south-southwest mainly through the mountains. He flows along the border between the administrative regions Ramechhap in the west and the east Okhaldhunga Sagarmatha. The catchment area of Likhu Khola bordered on the west by that of Tamakoshi and on the east by that of Dudh Kosi. The Likhu Khola has a length of about 75 km away.

References 

Rivers of Madhesh Province
Rivers of Koshi Province

Sub River of Likhu Khola
1. Bhuji Khola
2. Phastu Khola
3. ?